Sphecodes is a genus of bees from the family Halictidae, the majority of which are black and red in colour and are colloquially known as blood bees. Sphecodes bees are kleptoparasitic on other bees, especially bees in the genera Lasioglossum, Halictus and Andrena. The adults consume nectar, but because they use other bees' provisions to feed their offspring they do not collect pollen.

Distribution 
Sphecodes is a cosmopolitan genus with species represented on every continent. The genus is also very species rich, with 21 species described from Siberia, 33 species from Central Europe, 17 species from the Indian region, 26 from the Arabian Peninsula and surrounding region, and 21 from Southeast Asia. The genus is only represented in Australia in the northeast, with the species Sphecodes albilabris being thought to have been introduced to both Australia and the United States by accident.

Species
There are over 300 known species in the genus Sphecodes. As of 2015, there were 319 valid species described.

 Sphecodes abuensis Nurse, 1903
 Sphecodes abyssinicus Sichel, 1865
 Sphecodes aeneiceps Friese, 1917
 Sphecodes aino Tsuneki, 1983
 Sphecodes akitanus Tsuneki, 1983
 Sphecodes albifrons Smith, 1879
 Sphecodes albilabris (Fabricius, 1793)
 Sphecodes albociliatus Meyer, 1922
 Sphecodes algoensis Blüthgen, 1928
 Sphecodes alternatus Smith, 1853
 Sphecodes amakusensis Yasumatsu & Hirashima, 1951
 Sphecodes anatolicus Warncke, 1992
 Sphecodes andinus Schrottky, 1906
 Sphecodes angarensis Cockerell, 1937
 Sphecodes anonymus Blüthgen, 1928
 Sphecodes antennariae Robertson, 1891
 Sphecodes apicatus Smith, 1853
 Sphecodes arequipae Meyer, 1925
 Sphecodes argentinus Schrottky, 1906
 Sphecodes armeniacus Warncke, 1992
 Sphecodes arnoldi Blüthgen, 1928
 Sphecodes aroniae Mitchell, 1960
 Sphecodes arroyanus Cockerell, 1904
 Sphecodes arvensiformis Cockerell, 1904
 Sphecodes asclepiadis Cockerell, 1898
 Sphecodes aspericollis Sichel, 1865
 Sphecodes assamensis Blüthgen, 1927
 Sphecodes atlanticus Warncke, 1992
 Sphecodes atlantis Mitchell, 1956
 Sphecodes atriapicatus Strand, 1912
 Sphecodes autumnalis Mitchell, 1956
 Sphecodes awaensis Tsuneki, 1983
 Sphecodes bakeri Cockerell, 1915
 Sphecodes banaszaki Nobile & Turrisi, 2004
 Sphecodes banksii Lovell, 1909
 Sphecodes baratonis Tsuneki, 1983
 Sphecodes barbatus Blüthgen, 1923
 Sphecodes basalis Sichel, 1865
 Sphecodes binghami Blüthgen, 1924
 Sphecodes biroi Friese, 1909
 Sphecodes bischoffi Meyer, 1925
 Sphecodes bogotensis Meyer, 1922
 Sphecodes bonaerensis Holmberg, 1886
 Sphecodes borealis Cockerell, 1937
 Sphecodes brachycephalus Mitchell, 1956
 Sphecodes brasiliensis Schrottky, 1910
 Sphecodes braunsi Blüthgen, 1928
 Sphecodes breviclypeatus Tsuneki, 1984
 Sphecodes bruchi Schrottky, 1906
 Sphecodes brunneipes Friese, 1914
 Sphecodes californicus Meyer, 1922
 Sphecodes campadellii Nobile & Turrisi, 2004
 Sphecodes candidus Meyer, 1925
 Sphecodes capensis Cameron, 1905
 Sphecodes capriciosus Schrottky, 1906
 Sphecodes capverdensis Pauly & LaRoche, 2002
 Sphecodes carolinus Mitchell, 1956
 Sphecodes castaneae Mitchell, 1960
 Sphecodes centralis Cockerell, 1938
 Sphecodes cephalotes Meyer, 1920
 Sphecodes chaprensis Blüthgen, 1927
 Sphecodes chibaensis Tsuneki, 1984
 Sphecodes chichibuensis Tsuneki, 1986
 Sphecodes chichibuus Tsuneki, 1986
 Sphecodes chilensis Spinola, 1851
 Sphecodes clematidis Robertson, 1897
 Sphecodes clypeatus Friese, 1917
 Sphecodes columbiae Cockerell, 1906
 Sphecodes combai Nobile & Turrisi, 2004
 Sphecodes confertus Say, 1837
 Sphecodes confusus Blüthgen, 1928
 Sphecodes congoensis (Benoist, 1950)
 Sphecodes connexus Blüthgen, 1928
 Sphecodes convergens Michener, 1978
 Sphecodes convergens Tsuneki, 1983
 Sphecodes coptis Tsuneki, 1983
 Sphecodes cordillerensis Jörgensen, 1912
 Sphecodes cordovensis (Cockerell, 1919)
 Sphecodes coriae Moure & Hurd, 1987
 Sphecodes coronus Mitchell, 1956
 Sphecodes costaricensis Friese, 1917
 Sphecodes crassanus Warncke, 1992
 Sphecodes crassicornis Smith, 1879
 Sphecodes crassus Thomson, 1870
 Sphecodes crawfordi Mitchell, 1956
 Sphecodes cressonii (Robertson, 1903)
 Sphecodes cristatus Hagens, 1882
 Sphecodes croaticus Meyer, 1922
 Sphecodes daishi Tsuneki, 1983
 Sphecodes dathei Schwarz, 2010
 Sphecodes davisii Robertson, 1897
 Sphecodes decorus (Cameron, 1897)
 Sphecodes dichrous Smith, 1853
 Sphecodes dilutus Cockerell, 1936
 Sphecodes diremptus Cockerell, 1932
 Sphecodes discoverlifei Astafurova & Proshchalykin, 2020
 Sphecodes distinctus Meyer, 1925
 Sphecodes duplex Blüthgen, 1927
 Sphecodes duplipunctatus Tsuneki, 1983
 Sphecodes dusmeti Blüthgen, 1924
 Sphecodes dyozankeanus Tsuneki, 1983
 Sphecodes engeli Astafurova & Proshchalykin, 2020
 Sphecodes ephippius (Linné, 1767)
 Sphecodes equator Vachal, 1904
 Sphecodes eritrinus Friese, 1915
 Sphecodes eugnathus Blüthgen, 1928
 Sphecodes eustictus Cockerell, 1906
 Sphecodes exaltus Mitchell, 1956
 Sphecodes fattigi Mitchell, 1956
 Sphecodes ferruginatus Hagens, 1882
 Sphecodes fimbriatus Blüthgen, 1928
 Sphecodes formosus Cockerell, 1911
 Sphecodes fortior Cockerell, 1898
 Sphecodes fragariae Cockerell, 1903
 Sphecodes friesei Herbst, 1908
 Sphecodes fudzi Tsuneki, 1983
 Sphecodes fuelleborni Blüthgen, 1928
 Sphecodes fukuiensis Tsuneki, 1983
 Sphecodes fumipennis Smith, 1853
 Sphecodes galeritus Blüthgen, 1927
 Sphecodes galerus Lovell & Cockerell, 1907
 Sphecodes genaroi Engel, 2006
 Sphecodes geoffrellus (Kirby, 1802)
 Sphecodes gibbus (Linnaeus, 1758)
 Sphecodes grahami Cockerell, 1922
 Sphecodes grandidieri (Buysson, 1901)
 Sphecodes granulosus Sichel, 1865
 Sphecodes guineensis Vachal, 1903
 Sphecodes hagensi Ritsema, 1880
 Sphecodes haladai Warncke, 1992
 Sphecodes hanedai Tsuneki, 1983
 Sphecodes hasshanus Tsuneki, 1983
 Sphecodes hemirhodurus Cockerell, 1921
 Sphecodes heraclei Robertson, 1897
 Sphecodes hesperellus Cockerell, 1904
 Sphecodes hirtellus Blüthgen, 1923
 Sphecodes howardi Cockerell, 1922
 Sphecodes hudsoni Cockerell, 1913
 Sphecodes hyalinatus Hagens, 1882
 Sphecodes hydrangeae Mitchell, 1956
 Sphecodes illinoensis (Robertson, 1903)
 Sphecodes ilyadadaria Astafurova & Proshchalykin, 2020
 Sphecodes indicus Bingham, 1898
 Sphecodes invidus(Cameron, 1897)
 Sphecodes inornatus (Schrottky, 1902)
 Sphecodes insularis Smith, 1858
 Sphecodes intermedius Blüthgen, 1923
 Sphecodes iosephi Nobile & Turrisi, 2004
 Sphecodes iridescens Cockerell, 1921
 Sphecodes iridipennis Smith, 1879
 Sphecodes itidyo Tsuneki, 1983
 Sphecodes ituriensis Blüthgen, 1928
 Sphecodes iwatensis Tsuneki, 1983
 Sphecodes izumindus Tsuneki, 1986
 Sphecodes japonicus Cockerell, 1911
 Sphecodes javanicus Friese, 1914
 Sphecodes joergenseni Meyer, 1920
 Sphecodes johnsonii Lovell, 1909
 Sphecodes kaisensis Tsuneki, 1983
 Sphecodes kamafuse Tsuneki, 1983
 Sphecodes kershawi Perkins, 1921
 Sphecodes kincaidii Cockerell, 1898
 Sphecodes kisukei Tsuneki, 1983
 Sphecodes kitamius Tsuneki, 1983
 Sphecodes knetschi Cockerell, 1898
 Sphecodes koikensis Tsuneki, 1983
 Sphecodes kristenseni Meyer, 1919
 Sphecodes laetus Meyer, 1922
 Sphecodes lasimensis Blüthgen, 1927
 Sphecodes laticaudatus Tsuneki, 1983
 Sphecodes laticeps Meyer, 1920
 Sphecodes latifrons Cockerell, 1919
 Sphecodes lautipennis Cockerell, 1908
 Sphecodes levicinctus Cockerell, 1936
 Sphecodes levis Lovell & Cockerell, 1907
 Sphecodes libericus Cockerell, 1936
 Sphecodes longuloides Blüthgen, 1923
 Sphecodes longulus Hagens, 1882
 Sphecodes lunaris Vachal, 1904
 Sphecodes luteiventris Friese, 1925
 Sphecodes luzonicus Blüthgen, 1925
 Sphecodes macswaini Michener, 1954
 Sphecodes maetai Tsuneki, 1984
 Sphecodes magnipunctatus (Cockerell, 1946)
 Sphecodes majalis Pérez, 1903
 Sphecodes malayensis Blüthgen, 1927
 Sphecodes manchurianus Strand & Yasumatsu, 1938
 Sphecodes mandibularis Cresson, 1872
 Sphecodes manni Cockerell, 1913
 Sphecodes manskii (Rayment, 1935)
 Sphecodes marcellinoi Nobile & Turrisi, 2004
 Sphecodes marginatus Hagens, 1882
 Sphecodes maruyamanus Tsuneki, 1983
 Sphecodes melanopus Schrottky, 1906
 Sphecodes mendocinus Jörgensen, 1912
 Sphecodes metanotiaeus Sichel, 1865
 Sphecodes metathoracicus Sichel, 1865
 Sphecodes mexicanorum Cockerell, 1919
 Sphecodes millsi Cockerell, 1919
 Sphecodes minarum Schrottky, 1910
 Sphecodes miniatus Hagens, 1882
 Sphecodes minor Robertson, 1898
 Sphecodes monilicornis (Kirby, 1802)
 Sphecodes montanus Smith, 1879
 Sphecodes murotai Tsuneki, 1983
 Sphecodes mutillaeformis Schrottky, 1906
 Sphecodes mutsu Tsuneki, 1983
 Sphecodes mutsuoides Tsuneki, 1984
 Sphecodes nambui Tsuneki, 1983
 Sphecodes natalensis Friese, 1925
 Sphecodes niger Hagens, 1874
 Sphecodes nigeriae Blüthgen, 1928
 Sphecodes nigricans Timberlake, 1940
 Sphecodes nigricorpus Mitchell, 1956
 Sphecodes nigritus Ashmead, 1900
 Sphecodes nippon Meyer, 1922
 Sphecodes nipponicus Yasumatsu & Hirashima, 1951
 Sphecodes nitidissimus Cockerell, 1910
 Sphecodes niveatus Meyer, 1925
 Sphecodes niveipennis Meyer, 1925
 Sphecodes nomioidis Pesenko, 1979
 Sphecodes nyassanus Strand, 1911
 Sphecodes ohdeyamanus Tsuneki, 1984
 Sphecodes ohtsukius Tsuneki, 1984
 Sphecodes okuyetsu Tsuneki, 1983
 Sphecodes olivieri Lepeletier, 1825
 Sphecodes olympicus Cockerell, 1904
 Sphecodes oneili Cameron, 1905
 Sphecodes oriundus Vachal, 1903
 Sphecodes pallitarsis Vachal, 1909
 Sphecodes paraguayensis Schrottky, 1906
 Sphecodes paraplesius Lovell, 1911
 Sphecodes patagonicus Schrottky, 1906
 Sphecodes patruelis Cockerell, 1913
 Sphecodes pecosensis Cockerell, 1904
 Sphecodes pectoralis Morawitz, 1876
 Sphecodes pellucidus Smith, 1845
 Sphecodes perlustrans Cockerell, 1898
 Sphecodes perplexus Nurse, 1903
 Sphecodes persimilis Lovell & Cockerell, 1907
 Sphecodes peruensis Meyer, 1925
 Sphecodes pieli Cockerell, 1931
 Sphecodes pilosulus Smith, 1879
 Sphecodes pimpinellae Robertson, 1900
 Sphecodes pinguiculus Pérez, 1903
 Sphecodes politulus Cockerell, 1937
 Sphecodes profugus Cockerell, 1910
 Sphecodes propinquus Blüthgen, 1928
 Sphecodes prosphorus Lovell & Cockerell, 1907
 Sphecodes prostygius Mitchell, 1960
 Sphecodes pseudocrassus Blüthgen, 1924
 Sphecodes pseudofasciatus Blüthgen, 1925
 Sphecodes pseudoredivivus Astafurova & Proshchalykin, 2020
 Sphecodes pulsatillae Cockerell, 1906
 Sphecodes punctatus Sichel, 1865
 Sphecodes puncticeps Thomson, 1870
 Sphecodes puncticollis Sichel, 1865
 Sphecodes punctiscutum Eardley & R. P. Urban, 2006
 Sphecodes pusillus Cockerell, 1937
 Sphecodes pycnanthemi Robertson, 1897
 Sphecodes quadrimaculatus Blüthgen, 1928
 Sphecodes quellensis Blüthgen, 1927
 Sphecodes ralunensis Friese, 1909
 Sphecodes ranunculi Robertson, 1897
 Sphecodes redivivus Blüthgen, 1927
 Sphecodes reticulatus Thomson, 1870
 Sphecodes rhois (Cockerell, 1904)
 Sphecodes rikuchu Tsuneki, 1983
 Sphecodes rohweri Cockerell, 1907
 Sphecodes rotundiceps Cockerell, 1919
 Sphecodes rubicundus Hagens, 1875
 Sphecodes rubripes Spinola, 1838
 Sphecodes rudiusculus (Benoist, 1964)
 Sphecodes rufichelis Strand, 1912
 Sphecodes ruficrus (Erichson, 1835)
 Sphecodes rufiscapis Vachal, 1909
 Sphecodes rufithorax Morawitz, 1876
 Sphecodes rufiventris (Panzer, 1798)
 Sphecodes rufoantennatus Benoist, 1950
 Sphecodes rugulosus Sichel, 1865
 Sphecodes samarensis Blüthgen, 1927
 Sphecodes sapporensis Tsuneki, 1983
 Sphecodes sauteri Meyer, 1925
 Sphecodes saxicolus Warncke, 1992
 Sphecodes scabricollis Wesmael, 1835
 Sphecodes schenckii Hagens, 1882
 Sphecodes schoanus Blüthgen, 1928
 Sphecodes schwarzi Astafurova & Proshchalykin, 2015
 Sphecodes scrobiculatus Pauly & Brooks, 2001
 Sphecodes semicoloratus (Cockerell, 1897)
 Sphecodes senegalensis Sichel, 1865
 Sphecodes shawi Lovell, 1911
 Sphecodes shillongensis Blüthgen, 1927
 Sphecodes shirozui Tsuneki, 1983
 Sphecodes sibuyanensis Cockerell, 1925
 Sphecodes sikkimensis Blüthgen, 1927
 Sphecodes silvicola Tsuneki, 1983
 Sphecodes simillimus Smith, 1873
 Sphecodes simlaensis Blüthgen, 1924
 Sphecodes smilacinae Robertson, 1897
 Sphecodes solidaginis Cockerell, 1937
 Sphecodes solonis Graenicher, 1911
 Sphecodes sophiae Cockerell, 1898
 Sphecodes spinulosus Hagens, 1875
 Sphecodes strandi Meyer, 1920
 Sphecodes stygius Robertson, 1893
 Sphecodes subconfertus Sichel, 1865
 Sphecodes sudai Tsuneki, 1983
 Sphecodes sulcatulus Cockerell, 1906
 Sphecodes sulcifera Tsuneki, 1983
 Sphecodes tadschicus Blüthgen 1935
 Sphecodes taicho Tsuneki, 1983
 Sphecodes tainoi Engel, 2006
 Sphecodes tanoi Tsuneki, 1983
 Sphecodes tantalus Nurse, 1903
 Sphecodes tertius Blüthgen, 1927
 Sphecodes togoanus Strand, 1912
 Sphecodes tomarchioi Nobile & Turrisi, 2004
 Sphecodes townesi Mitchell, 1956
 Sphecodes transversus Cockerell, 1919
 Sphecodes trentonensis Cockerell, 1913
 Sphecodes tristellus Cockerell, 1919
 Sphecodes tuckeri Friese, 1925
 Sphecodes turanicus Astafurova & Proshchalykin, 2017
 Sphecodes turneri Cockerell, 1916
 Sphecodes ugandae Blüthgen, 1928
 Sphecodes utinamius Tsuneki, 1983
 Sphecodes vachali Meyer, 1920
 Sphecodes variabilis Schrottky, 1906
 Sphecodes veganus Cockerell, 1904
 Sphecodes villosulus Schwarz, 2010
 Sphecodes vumbuensis Blüthgen, 1928
 Sphecodes walteri Nobile & Turrisi, 2004
 Sphecodes washingtoni Cockerell, 1904
 Sphecodes wheeleri Mitchell, 1956
 Sphecodes woodi Cockerell, 1945
 Sphecodes zangherii'' Noskiewicz, 1931

References

Halictidae
Bee genera